Mohammad Mad Malisi is an Iranian football defender who plays for Naft Masjed Soleyman in the Iran Pro League.

Club career
Mad Malisi started his career with Esteghlal Ahvaz from youth levels. He was promoted to the first team after relegation to Division 2 in 2011. He was a regular starter in his first season with Esteghlal Ahvaz while he helped them to gain promotion to Division 1. In summer 2013 he joined Esteghlal Khuzestan with a 3-year contract but failed to make any appearances for them. He joined Naft Masjed Soleyman in summer 2014 and made his debut for them on 19 September 2014 against Naft Tehran as a starter.

Club career statistics

References

External links
 Mohammad Mad Malisi at PersianLeague.com
 Mohammad Mad Malisi at IranLeague.ir

1993 births
Living people
Iranian footballers
Esteghlal Ahvaz players
Esteghlal Khuzestan players
People from Ahvaz
Association football defenders
Sportspeople from Khuzestan province